Ajax Animator is a free, web-based animation suite. Its development began in March 2006 by Antimatter15, then a sixth grader. Ajax Animator was originally intended to be a free replacement to Flash MX, but is now a general-purpose animation tool. Ajax Animator is primarily written using JavaScript, the Ext JS framework, and HTML5-related technologies such as SVG. The software can be used either from within a web browser or from an offline installation.

History 
Ajax Animator began as an ambitious project by Antimatter15, then a 6th grader. Its intended use was to draw stick figures and animation and export them to Flash files, as an alternative to the expensive Flash MX desktop program. It was first inspired by the Koolmoves Flash editing software. Development started around March 2006, based on the RichDraw JavaScript library, which allowed for in-browser graphics creation.

The application was soon rewritten to use the DHTML Suite library from DHTML Goodies, and finally allowed for exporting SWF files through the Freemovie Java library. Development subsequently moved to Subversion on Google Code to ease production.

Version 1.0 was rewritten to use version 1.0 of Sencha's Ext JS library instead. It also added support for inbetweening and sharing projects. The next version, 0.20, was a complete rewrite to support version 2.0 of Ext JS, and used the OnlyPaths library by josep_ssv, which extended RichDraw and was designed specifically for Ajax Animator.

Later versions used the author's own VectorEditor library, based on the Raphaël framework.

See also
List of 2D animation software

References

External links 
 Ajax Animator info page
 Ajax Animator 0.20.02 (OnlyPaths)
 Ajax Animator 0.20.05 Wave (VectorEditor)
 Google Code

Free 2D animation software
Free vector graphics editors
Motion graphics software for Linux